|}

The Spring Cup is a Listed flat horse race in Great Britain open to horses aged three years only.
It is run at Lingfield over a distance of 7 furlongs and 1 yard, and it is scheduled to take place each year in late February or early March.

The race was first run in 2003, and was awarded Listed status in 2004.

Records

Leading jockey (3 wins):
 Richard Hughes – Party Boss (2005), Paco Boy (2008), Lexington Times (2015)

Leading trainer (4 wins):
 William Haggas - Ertijaal (2014), Second Thought (2017), Headway (2018), Fanaar (2019)

Winners

See also
 Horse racing in Great Britain
 List of British flat horse races

References
Racing Post:

Flat races in Great Britain
Flat horse races for three-year-olds
Lingfield Park Racecourse
Recurring sporting events established in 2003
2003 establishments in England